Gyfeillon Platform railway station, also known as Gyfeillon Halt railway station, co-served the town of Pontypridd, in the historical county of Glamorganshire, Wales, from 1905 to 1918 on the Taff Vale Railway.

History 
The station was opened on 5 June 1905 by the Taff Vale Railway. It closed in July 1918.

References 

Disused railway stations in Rhondda Cynon Taf
Railway stations in Great Britain opened in 1905
Railway stations in Great Britain closed in 1918
1905 establishments in Wales
1918 disestablishments in Wales
Former Taff Vale Railway stations